Burgäschisee is a lake near Aeschi in Switzerland, on the border of the cantons of Berne and Solothurn. The lake has a surface of 21 ha and a maximum depth of 36 m.

In 1941 and 1943, the waterlevel was lowered by 2 m. The current surface elevation is 465 m.

External links
Burgäschisee  Tourist information

Lakes of Switzerland
Lakes of the canton of Bern
Lakes of the canton of Solothurn
LBurgaschisee
Bern–Solothurn border